Greatest Hits is a compilation album released in 2001 by D.R.I. According to the band, the label released the compilation without listening to it, resulting in an incorrect track list and ticking noises on a couple of the tracks.

The album was initially released in two different titles: the 2004 reissue was released as Dirty Rotten Hitz while the 2005 version was released as Thrashkore Retrospektif.

Track listing
"Who Am I" – 0:49
"Commuter Man" – 0:58
"Yes Ma'am" – 0:50
"Sad To Be" – 1:42
"The Explorer" – 2:58
"Violent Pacification" – 1:35
"Argument Then War" – 1:25
"Mad Man" – 1:40
"Couch Slouch" – 3:22
"Nursing Home Blues" – 3:50
"I Don't Need Society" – 0:59
"A Coffin" – 3:05
"Redline" – 4:06
"Hooked" – 3:00
"Probation" – 4:05
"Five Year Plan" – 2:44 
"No Religion" – 2:12

Credits
Kurt Brecht – Vocals
Spike Cassidy – Guitars
Chumly Porter – Bass
Ron Rampy – Drums

References

D.R.I. (band) albums
2001 compilation albums